Yekeh Chah (also Romanized as Yekeh Chāh and Yekkeh Chāh; also known as Ḩammām) is a village in Baqerabad Rural District, in the Central District of Mahallat County, Markazi Province, Iran. At the 2006 census, its population was 83, in 19 families.

References 

Populated places in Mahallat County